Exxon Mobil Corp. v. Saudi Basic Industries Corp., 544 U.S. 280 (2005), is a United States Supreme Court case in which the Court clarified the Rooker-Feldman doctrine and its relation to preclusion and concurrent jurisdiction.

Background 
In 1980, two subsidiaries of Exxon Mobil Corporation (the plaintiff and petitioner in this matter) formed a joint venture with defendant/respondent Saudi Basic Industries Corporation (SABIC).  Twenty years later, a dispute arose over royalties SABIC had charged Exxon Mobil's subsidiaries for sublicenses to a polyethylene manufacturing method, and SABIC sued the two subsidiaries in Delaware Superior Court in July 2000.

Instead of first filing a counterclaim in the Delaware state court system, Exxon Mobil and its subsidiaries chose to sue SABIC in the United States District Court for the District of New Jersey. There, they alleged that SABIC had overcharged the subsidiaries for the sublicenses. Exxon Mobil claimed subject-matter jurisdiction in federal court under , which gives the United States district courts jurisdiction over foreign states.

In January 2002, Exxon Mobil filed an answer to SABIC's complaint in the Delaware state court, asserting the same counterclaims that they had filed in federal court. Meanwhile, SABIC moved to dismiss the federal suit. The district court denied the motion.  The state suit reached trial first, and the jury returned a huge verdict for Exxon Mobil, totalling over $400 million. SABIC then appealed the judgment to the Delaware Supreme Court.

SABIC also filed an interlocutory appeal with the United States Court of Appeals for the Third Circuit of the denial of their motion to dismiss the federal suit. The Third Circuit raised, sua sponte (on its own motion), the issue of subject-matter jurisdiction, and concluded that the Rooker-Feldman doctrine precluded the district court from proceeding, on the grounds that Exxon Mobil's claims had already been heard in state court—even though Exxon Mobil was not seeking to have the state court verdict overturned.

Issue 
The main issue in this case was whether the Rooker-Feldman doctrine overrides the preclusion doctrine  (see res judicata) or concurrent jurisdiction of the state & federal courts.

Opinion of the Court 
Justice Ginsburg, writing for a unanimous Court, reversed the Third Circuit's decision and remanded the case.  She began her decision with a fairly concise retelling of the holdings in both the Rooker  and Feldman cases.  She then held that the Rooker-Feldman doctrine

is confined to cases of the kind from which the doctrine acquired its name:  cases brought by state-court losers complaining of injuries caused by state-court judgments rendered before the district court proceedings commenced and inviting district court review and rejection of those judgments.  Rooker-Feldman does not otherwise override or supplant preclusion doctrine or augment the circumscribed doctrines that allow federal courts to stay or dismiss proceedings in deference to state-court actions.

125 S.Ct. at 1521-1522.

This essentially had the effect of cabining the Rooker-Feldman doctrine and limiting its application, defining it as separate and distinct from both preclusion and abstention doctrine.  Furthermore, Ginsburg went on to explain that parallel litigation in both state and federal courts does not automatically trigger Rooker-Feldman, and that federal courts must give state court judgments preclusive effect under the Full Faith and Credit Act, .

External links
 

United States Constitution Article Three case law
Rooker–Feldman doctrine case law
United States Supreme Court cases
United States Supreme Court cases of the Rehnquist Court
2005 in United States case law
ExxonMobil litigation